Prem Chand Ram  is an Indian politician. He was elected to the lower House of the Indian Parliament the Lok Sabha from Nawada, Bihar as a member of the Communist Party of India (Marxist).

References

External links
Official biographical sketch in Parliament of India website

Communist Party of India (Marxist) politicians
1946 births
India MPs 1991–1996
Lok Sabha members from Bihar
Living people